Acidonia microcarpa is a species of shrub in the plant family Proteaceae. It is the only species in the genus Acidonia. It is endemic to the south coast of the Southwest Botanic Province of Western Australia.

It was originally published by Robert Brown in 1810 as a species of Persoonia. In 1975, Lawrence Alexander Sidney Johnson and Barbara G. Briggs erected the genus Acidonia, transferring a great many Persoonia species into it. Later, the circumscription of Acidonia was changed to include only A. microcarpa.

However, phylogenetic studies indicate that Acidonia is nested in the larger genus Persoonia, where it was once included

References

External links

Proteaceae
Proteales of Australia
Eudicots of Western Australia
Monotypic Proteaceae genera
Taxa named by Barbara G. Briggs
Taxa named by Lawrence Alexander Sidney Johnson
Endemic flora of Southwest Australia